Araphura whakarakaia is a species of tanaidomorphan malacostracan crustacean found in New Zealand. They rely on drag-powered swimming to move around, and like most species of crustacean, they live in the benthic zone.

References

External links

WORMS

Tanaidacea
Marine crustaceans of New Zealand
Crustaceans described in 2011